Hemisilurus heterorhynchus is a species of sheatfish first described by Pieter Bleeker in 1853. Hemisilurus heterorhynchus is part of the genus Hemisilurus and the family Siluridae.

References 

Siluridae
Fish described in 1853
Taxa named by Pieter Bleeker